Springdale Township is a township in Allegheny County, Pennsylvania, United States.  The population was 1,636 at the 2010 census. The eastern side of the township is known as Orrville, and the western side as Harwick.

Geography

Recreation
Recreational areas of Springdale Township include Agan Park, Marina Park and the Pennsylvania State Game Lands Number 203.

Education
Springdale Township is served by the Allegheny Valley School District, which utilizes Springdale High School.

Government and politics

Demographics

At the 2000 census there were 1,802 people, 797 households, and 536 families living in the township.  The population density was 804.9 people per square mile (310.6/km).  There were 838 housing units at an average density of 374.3/sq mi (144.4/km).  The racial makeup of the township was 99.61% White, 0.06% African American, and 0.33% from two or more races. Hispanic or Latino of any race were 0.11%.

There were 797 households, 22.7% had children under the age of 18 living with them, 54.0% were married couples living together, 9.5% had a female householder with no husband present, and 32.7% were non-families. 28.4% of households were made up of individuals, and 11.5% were one person aged 65 or older.  The average household size was 2.26 and the average family size was 2.75.

The age distribution was 18.6% under the age of 18, 5.2% from 18 to 24, 27.3% from 25 to 44, 28.4% from 45 to 64, and 20.5% 65 or older.  The median age was 44 years. For every 100 females, there were 92.9 males.  For every 100 females age 18 and over, there were 88.2 males.

The median household income was $39,071 and the median family income was $43,269. Males had a median income of $33,472 versus $29,375 for females. The per capita income for the township was $21,598.  About 3.8% of families and 5.0% of the population were below the poverty line, including 3.7% of those under age 18 and 4.4% of those age 65 or over.

References

Pittsburgh metropolitan area
Townships in Allegheny County, Pennsylvania
Townships in Pennsylvania